The Prey Lang Forest is a forest in Kampong Thom, Preah Vihear, Kratie and Stung Treng Provinces in Northern Cambodia. The forest covers an estimated 3,600 square kilometres (1,390 square miles). It is one of Southeast Asia's last remaining lowland evergreen woodlands. It is the largest remaining lowland evergreen forest on the Indochinese peninsula and approximately 200,000 members of ethnic minorities live in or around the Prey Lang.

Protected area 
Part of the Prey Lang Forest is covered by Prey Lang Wildlife Sanctuary, first created in 2016.

Indigenous communities
Prey Lang plays a central role in the lives of hundreds of thousands of people in Cambodia. Around 200,000 people, mostly members of the indigenous Kuy people, live in districts surrounding Prey Lang, a name which means "Our Forest" in the Kuy language. Prey Lang is an intricate part of their culture and spiritual life and they have depended upon it for generations, collecting resin, building materials, medicine, and food from the forest. Another 700,000 people live within 10 kilometers from Prey Lang, also for whom the forest is essential.

Deforestation

Prey Lang is under threat from a variety of sources which have put short-sighted economic interests ahead of a nation's long-term well-being. Agribusiness plantations and mining operations are cutting away at the forest, including sensitive core areas. Illegal logging for timber, including luxury wood, is rampant, depriving communities of the resin trees they depend on. It is estimated that up to 250,000 resin trees have been lost to chainsaws. 
Illegal mining for precious metals and iron ore has also been on the increase, displacing artisanal, environmentally friendly operations. Toxic chemicals are being dumped into Prey Lang waterways, upsetting the area's delicate ecological balance and endangering downstream communities. 
In addition, new roads are cutting into important and sensitive areas of the forest, and making it easier for unscrupulous actors to illegally clear forest, transport timber, and engage in poaching.

Prey Lang Wildlife Sanctuary

References

External links 

Wildlife sanctuaries of Cambodia
Protected areas of Cambodia
Forests of Cambodia
Rainforests
Old-growth forests
Geography of Kampong Thom province
Environmental justice